Stéphanie Alexandra Mina Sokolinski (born 26 October 1985), and known professionally as Soko (stylized as SoKo), is a French singer, songwriter, actress and dancer. She has been active since 2002. Soko released her debut single "I'll Kill Her" in 2007. It achieved airplay success in several European countries as well as Australia, being the No. 1 song on the Danish  version of iTunes and peaking at No. 3 on the Denmark music charts. It was included on her first EP Not Sokute (2007). Her debut studio album I Thought I Was an Alien was released in 2012 and contains the single "We Might Be Dead by Tomorrow", which peaked at number nine on the Billboard Hot 100. Ensuing years saw the releases of her second and third studio albums My Dreams Dictate My Reality (2015) and Feel Feelings (2020).

As an actress, Soko began appearing in a number of French productions in the early 2000s and earned a César Award for Most Promising Actress nomination for her role in the film In the Beginning (2009). She won the Courage in Acting Award at the Women Film Critics Circle Awards and the Best Actress award at the Mar del Plata Film Festival for her role as Augustine in the film of the same name (2012). She later appeared in the short film First Kiss (2014), which featured "We Might Be Dead by Tomorrow" and contributed to the song's chart success. Her role as Loie Fuller in The Dancer (2016) earned her Best Actress nominations at the César and Lumières Awards.

Early life
Sokolinski was born in Bordeaux, France to a Russian-Polish father and a French-Italian mother. She has used the nickname Soko as long as she can remember. Soko left home at 16, quit school and moved to Paris to start acting classes with Eva Saint-Paul where she studied for one year; she then resumed her education at several different schools, but quickly became tired of it and dropped out. She later appeared in several French films and began to write songs.

Musical career

In 2007, Sokolinski achieved a hit single in Denmark with a personal anecdotal song, "I'll Kill Her", after the radio program The Black Boy Scouts began to promote it. The song reached number one on the chart of the Danish version of the iTunes Store and was the number one song in rotation on radio. The song is also a hit in Australia, being played on high rotation on Triple J radio; it later placed number nine in the Triple J Hottest 100 2007 music poll. The song was also popular in Belgium being played by Studio Brussel, Radio 1 and Pure FM, and in The Netherlands, being picked up by 3FM radio station. In October 2007 her music was featured in Stella McCartney's fashion show in Paris. She toured in the UK in late 2007 supporting M.I.A. on the KALA Tour. Since early 2008 she has also been played in Germany by 1LIVE, first only at night in 1Live Plan B but later, due to high demand, throughout the whole day.

Sokolinski has self-released one EP Not Sokute, and collaborated with The Go! Team and Cornershop, the latter on a song called "Something Makes You Feel Like". She has her own record label called Babycat Records and is signed to Because Music in France.

In 2010, her song "I'll Kill Her", was sampled by Cee Lo Green on his Stray Bullets mixtape under the track of the same name.

In 2011, she wrote a song and featured in the animated short film Mourir Auprès De Toi, which was co-written and directed by Spike Jonze.

Her debut album, I Thought I Was an Alien, was released in February 2012.

In 2014, Soko's song "We Might Be Dead by Tomorrow" was featured in Tatia Pilieva's short video "First Kiss". She was also one of the video's twenty subjects. After "First Kiss" went viral on YouTube, the song debuted at number 9 in the Billboard Hot 100 and number 1 on Billboard's Streaming Songs chart.

In March 2014, Soko appeared in the music video for the song "Jealous" by Canadian electro-funk band Chromeo.

In 2015 We Might Be Dead by Tomorrow was also used in an episode of the American TV series - Forever.

Her second studio album, My Dreams Dictate My Reality was released in March 2015, its first single "Who Wears the Pants??" was released on 7 January. The Sonic Seducer wrote that the album was darker than the previous releases and called it a "female version of early The Cure discs".

Soko collaborated with The Brian Jonestown Massacre on a song called "Philadelphie Story" for their album Musique de Film Imaginé, released in April 2015.

In 2017, Soko collaborated with Residente on a song called "Desencuentro" for his debut solo album.

In July 2020, Soko released her third studio album, Feel Feelings.

Live performances 

Sokolinski has had sold-out concerts in Scandinavia, Britain, and Australia. She performed at the Falls Festival at the end of 2008, the Southbound Festival and the Sunset Sounds Festival at the start of 2009. She has performed in the Los Angeles venues Henry Fonda, Troubadour, Bootleg Theatre, Spaceland, and Echoplex, and has played in support of Peter Doherty, Babyshambles, Kate Nash, Nouvelle Vague, Daniel Johnston, Foster The People, and Johnny Borrell. In San Francisco, she performed at Bottom of the Hill on 15 June 2012.

As a live performer, the singer acts unpredictably and never uses a set list; her backing band consists mostly of different friend-musicians at each show. She sometimes plays up to 3 hours by herself, in intimate and quiet venues.

Musical hiatus 
On 19 January 2009 Sokolinski stated on her Myspace page that she was quitting music and is 'dead', writing that she was scared of the music industry and wanted to return to acting. Despite having recorded a double album in Seattle, she is not willing to release it.
In August of the same year, she declared that she was 'reborn' and writing songs such as "I'm So Ready to Be a Good Man" where she writes:
"in my battle with the demons
I just had to die
coz they're way too evil
and I couldn't fight"
She later referred to the pressure of the music industry, before declaring that she was "having a new heart and being ready to be a new man".

In August 2011, Soko announced the release of her first album I Thought I Was an Alien on 6 February 2012, on her website www.s-o-k-o.com and a 17 August 2012 show at the Bootleg Theatre in Los Angeles, CA on Facebook. She released her first single on YouTube 1 August 2011 entitled "No More Home, No More Love". Two other singles were released "I Thought I Was An Alien" and "First Love Never Die".

Acting career 

In February 2010, Soko was nominated for a César Award for Most Promising Actress for her role in À l'origine (English title In the Beginning), directed by Xavier Giannoli.

Personal life 
Soko is a vegan. This may be connected with the fact that she became straight edge when she was 18. She also refers to herself as a "white goth".

She moved from Paris to Los Angeles in 2008.

Soko has been identified as bisexual in 2012. In a March 2016 interview with W Magazine, she stated, "I've always been open with my sexuality, meaning I don't really care about gender". She also confirmed her relationship with American actress Kristen Stewart in the same article. On 5 May 2016, US Weekly confirmed that Stewart and Soko had split after a few months of dating. 

Soko identified herself as Queer and no longer bisexual in an interview for The Nue Co. on 26 June 2020: "I called myself bisexual then. "Queer" wasn't yet an option. And slowly I realised that dating women made me feel so much more like myself, less oppressed, more equal and more empowered."

She confirmed in a Facebook post on 30 July 2018, that she was 25 weeks pregnant. In November 2018, she gave birth to son Indigo Blue Honey Sokolinski (named after a song by The Clean), whom she is raising with her partner, Stella Leoni. Australian singer Nick Cave is the Godfather of her son.

She moved back to Paris with her family in August 2022.

Discography

Albums

EPs

Singles

Guest performances

Filmography

References

External links

Stéphanie Sokolinski: Filmographie on allocine.fr

1985 births
Living people
Musicians from Bordeaux
French television actresses
French people of Italian descent
French people of Polish descent
French people of Russian descent
French film actresses
21st-century French actresses
French voice actresses
Queer singers
Queer songwriters
Queer actresses
Actresses from Bordeaux
French LGBT singers
French LGBT songwriters
Indie pop musicians
21st-century French women singers
Because Music artists